KRIMI.DE is a German crime drama series, aired by the German television channel KiKA between 2005 and 2013. The format of the show involves presenting criminal cases from the perspective of children which then get solved by the child protagonists in coordination with the police. The series was aired in the German states of Erfurt, Hamburg, Jena, Leipzig, Stuttgart and Frankfurt am Main. Following broadcast, the first 4 episodes were released on DVD. Then, in March 2015, 2 box sets were released containing all 32 episodes between them.

Cast

Team Erfurt
Constantin von der Decken as Conny
Mathilde Bundschuh as Julia
Stefan Tetzlaff as Lukas
Dominique Horwitz as commissioner Meininger

Team Hamburg
Nelia Novoa as Amelie
Rona Özkan as Coco
Vijessna Ferkic as police officer Natascha
Denis Moschitto and Hilmi Sözer in supporting roles

Vijessna Ferkic played the same role in the series Die Pfefferkörner ("The Peppercorns").

Team Jena
Miriam Schweiger as Sophie
David Bode as Ben
Andreas Patton as commissioner Ralf Vormann

Team Leipzig
Luizza Grimm as Mandy
Maximillian Befort as Tom
Josef Mattes as Louis
Peter Sodann as commissioner Bruno Ehrlicher (known from the series Tatort)

Team Stuttgart
Jette Hering as Klara Stolz
Jeremy Mockridge as Tim Mederling
Liam Mockridge as Maz Mederling
Richy Müller as chief commissioner Thorsten Lannert (also known from the series Tatort)

Team Frankfurt am Main
Mala Emde as Ronja
Sean Bishop as Jay Jay
Franz Schönberger as Alex
Anke Sevenich as Alex' mother
Rainer Ewerrien as Alex' father
Jasmin Schwiers as police officer Eva
Patrick Dewayne as police officer Anthony

Episodes

See also
List of German television series

References

External links
 

German crime television series
2005 German television series debuts
2013 German television series endings
German-language television shows
2000s German police procedural television series
2010s German police procedural television series